Gatesville is a city in and the county seat of Coryell County, Texas, United States. Its population was 16,135 at the 2020 census. The city has five of the nine prisons and state jails for women operated by the Texas Department of Criminal Justice. One of the facilities, the Mountain View Unit, has the state's death row for women.

Gatesville is part of the Killeen–Temple–Fort Hood metropolitan statistical area.

Geography

The city is located northeast of the center of Coryell County at  (31.436755, –97.735257), on the east side of the Leon River, part of the Brazos River watershed.

It is midway between Austin and Fort Worth.

U.S. Route 84 runs through the city, leading east  to Waco and west  to Goldthwaite. Texas State Highway 36 passes through the east side of the city, leading northwest  to Hamilton and southeast  to Temple.

History 

Gatesville was established in 1854 on land donated by Richard G. Grant (1808–1858), shortly after the organization of Coryell County. The name was taken from Fort Gates, which had been established in 1849, about  5 miles west.

Demographics

2020 census

As of the 2020 United States census, there were 16,135 people, 1,986 households, and 1,151 families residing in the city.

2000 census
As of the census of 2000, 15,591 people, 2,640 households, and 1,752 families resided in the city. The population density was 1,794.2 people per square mile (692.7/km2). There were 2,963 housing units at an average density of 341.0 per square mile (131.6/km2). The racial makeup of the city was 63.20% White, 27.00% African American, 0.34% Native American, 0.35% Asian, 0.05% Pacific Islander, 8.49% from other races, and 0.56% from two or more races. Hispanics or Latinos of any race were 14.73% of the population.

Of the 2,640 households, 32.5% had children under the age of 18 living with them, 49.2% were married couples living together, 13.3% had a female householder with no husband present, and 33.6% were not families. About 29.9% of all households were made up of individuals, and 15.2% had someone living alone who was 65 years of age or older. The average household size was 2.46 and the average family size was 3.04.

In the city, the age distribution was 11.7% under 18, 10.3% from 18 to 24, 53.9% from 25 to 44, 16.3% from 45 to 64, and 7.7% who were 65  or older. The median age was 35 years. For every 100 females, there were 63.8 males. For every 100 females age 18 and over, there were 59.6 males.

The median income for a household in the city was $29,534, and for a family was $36,543. Males had a median income of $30,625 versus $17,073 for females. The per capita income for the city was $11,152. About 12.4% of families and 14.3% of the population were below the poverty line, including 17.7% of those under age 18 and 14.9% of those age 65 or over.

Due to the establishment of the Texas Department of Criminal Justice prisons, from 1980 to 2010, the population doubled. As of 2000, about 9,000 of the 15,591 residents were state prisoners.

Economy 
Two manufacturing companies are located in Gatesville:
 Kalyn Siebert is a worldwide leader in the manufacture of premium, custom-engineered heavy-haul trailers and equipment for construction, oilfield and energy, national defense, and other specialized transportation requirements.
 Laerdal Medical Corporation, a division of Laerdal based in Norway, is a manufacturer of plastic medical teaching supplies.  The division, formerly known as Medical Plastics Laboratories, Inc., was founded in 1949 by three Gatesville doctors.  In January 2000, it was sold to Laerdal.

Prisons
Gatesville is the home of several prisons operated by the Texas Department of Criminal Justice, including the Mountain View Unit, which houses the women's death row. Gatesville is located on the northern edge of Fort Hood, and as such is also dependent on the military for a part of its economy (besides Fort Hood, a large military vehicle repair facility is located on the east side of town).

As of 2012, the prisons in the Gatesville area employ 2,600 people. Most of the employees live in Coryell County. Timothy F. Orwig (born 1949) of the Cove Herald said, "Correctional officers in gray uniforms have been a common sight in the town's businesses for years, and the job of a 'prison boss' was once a highly regarded career choice in Gatesville."

Of the eight Texas Department of Criminal Justice general correctional facilities for women, which include five prisons and three state jails, five of the units, including four prisons and one state jail, are in the City of Gatesville.

The Christina Melton Crain Unit prison (formerly Gatesville Unit), the Hilltop Unit prison, the Dr. Lane Murray Unit prison, and the Linda Woodman Unit state jail are co-located amongst one another. In addition the Mountain View Unit, a prison with the State of Texas female death row, is in Gatesville. One prison for males, the Alfred D. Hughes Unit, is in Gatesville. As of 2012, the 5,552 female prisoners and 2,958 male prisoners were over half of the population of the city.

Mountain View Unit opened in July 1975, Crain opened in August 1980, Hilltop opened in November 1981, and Hughes opened in January 1990. The Murray Unit opened in November 1995, and the Woodman Unit opened in June 1997.

Gatesville previously hosted the Gatesville State School and the Mountain View State School, juvenile correctional centers of the Texas Youth Commission. The Mountain View State School closed in 1975, and the Gatesville State School closed in 1979. The buildings were transferred to the Texas Department of Corrections and were used as prisons for adults.

Post office 
The United States Postal Service operates the Gatesville Post Office.

Public education and educational resources 
The Gatesville Independent School District operates public schools.  Gatesville has a public library.

Parks and recreation 
Since 2000, the Prison Boss Cookoff, a barbecue competition that serves as a fundraiser for the  Correctional Peace Officers Foundation, has been held every year. Orwig described it as "a family gathering of prison workers."

Other highlights 

Donated in 1991, the Coryell County Museum in Gatesville is home to the Loyd and Madge Mitchell Collection of about 10,000 pairs of spurs, thought to be the largest such collection in the world. In 2001, the 77th Texas Legislature designated Gatesville the "Spur Capital of Texas".

As of 2014, the Last Drive-In Picture Show in Gatesville, opened by Gene Palmer in 1955—and, as of 2004, owned by his son, Audie Gene Palmer (1957–2004)—is one of 17 remaining drive-in theaters in Texas; of those 17, it is one of oldest and longest continuously running.

The Gatesville High School Hornets were the 2000 Texas UIL 4A high-school football champions.

Notable people

 William Blankenship (born 1928), opera tenor
 Bart Bryant (born 1962), professional golfer
 Cotton Davidson (born 1931), former AFL and NFL quarterback
 Dan Edwards (1926–2001), professional football player
 Mary Beth Harrell (born 1956), regional TV talk-show host and former prosecutor for the City of Temple
 Taurean Henderson (born 1983), former NFL football player
 David Holt (born 1946), musician
 Jim Miller (1866–1909), outlaw who lived with his sister and brother-in-law on the Plum Ranch, outside of Gatesville
 Frank S. Page, pastor
 J. D. Sheffield (born 1960), physician and state legislator
 Benny Thomasson (1909–1984), Texas fiddler
 Bulldog Turner (1919–1998), NFL football player
 Mike Weaver (born 1951), former WBA boxer

See also 

 Flat, Texas
 Gatesville Municipal Airport
 KYAR
 List of city nicknames in Texas
 My Ghost Story TV series location
 National Register of Historic Places listings in Coryell County, Texas
 Roman Catholic Diocese of Austin, Waco Deanery
 Scott & White Memorial Hospital
 Stephenville North and South Texas Railway
 Texas locations by per capita income
 Texas State Guard, Army, 2nd Regiment, Gatesville
 Troop 1500, 2005 documentary film
 W.C. Dodson (1829–1914), architect of the Coryell County Courthouse in Gatesville
 71st Battlefield Surveillance Brigade

References

External links 
 
 Gatesville Chamber of Commerce

 
Cities in Coryell County, Texas
Cities in Texas
County seats in Texas
Killeen–Temple–Fort Hood metropolitan area